The Canton of Bernaville  is a former canton situated in the department of the Somme and in the Picardy region of northern France. It was disbanded following the French canton reorganisation which came into effect in March 2015. It consisted of 24 communes, which joined the canton of Doullens in 2015. It had 5,631 inhabitants (2012).

Geography 
The canton is organised around the commune of Bernaville in the arrondissement of Amiens. The altitude varies from 35m at Béalcourt to 167m at Fienvillers for an average of 111m.

The canton comprised 24 communes:

Agenville
Autheux
Barly
Béalcourt
Beaumetz
Bernâtre
Bernaville
Boisbergues
Candas
Domesmont
Épécamps
Fienvillers
Frohen-sur-Authie
Gorges
Heuzecourt
Maizicourt
Le Meillard
Mézerolles
Montigny-les-Jongleurs
Occoches
Outrebois
Prouville
Remaisnil
Saint-Acheul

Population

See also
 Arrondissements of the Somme department
 Cantons of the Somme department
 Communes of the Somme department

References

Bernaville
2015 disestablishments in France
States and territories disestablished in 2015